The Balfa Brothers (or Les Frères Balfa) were an American cajun music ensemble. Its members were five brothers; Dewey on fiddle, Will on fiddle, Rodney on guitar, harmonica, and vocals, Burkeman on triangle and spoons, and Harry on Cajun accordion.

History
The brothers first played together at family gatherings in the 1940s. Their father,  Charles Balfa, a sharecropper, had played fiddle and was a singer. Along with Hadley Fontenot, an accordionist and acquaintance of the family, they made their first recordings in 1951. The 78rpm single was "La Valse de Bon Baurche" b/w "Le Two Step de Ville Platte", recorded at their house. After this Dewey went on to a successful solo career, recording on his own and with many ensembles.

Adopting the name Balfa Brothers in 1967, Dewey, Rodney, Will, Hadley Fontenot, and Dewey's daughter Nelda started touring folk festivals and European venues, playing Cajun music at a time in which its impact on American music had largely been forgotten. They made their first new recordings that year, and played at the 1968 Summer Olympics in Mexico City.

They released several albums and appeared in the 1972 documentary Spend it All. Over time they experimented with blending traditional Cajun music with more modern orchestral sounds. They continued together until 1979; that year Rodney and Will died in an auto accident. In 1980, Dewey's wife died of trichinosis. Following further lineup changes, the group continued under the name a few years later, and an ensemble continued to perform even after Dewey died in 1992.

The Balfa Brothers together with Marc Savoy appear playing "Parlez-nous à Boire" towards the end of the 1981 Walter Hill film, Southern Comfort. Their song "La Danse de Mardi Gras" appears on the soundtracks for the 1992 film Passion Fish and the 2012 film Beasts of the Southern Wild and Serenity (2019 film). It also appeared in a commercial for Carling Black Label Lager.

Two of the Balfa Brothers, along with the late Cajun accordionist Danny Poulard, are briefly in the movie Garlic Is As Good As Ten Mothers, a 1980 documentary film about garlic directed by Les Blank.

Discography

 The Balfa Brothers Play Traditional Cajun Music (Swallow Records, 1967)
 The Cajuns (Sonet Records, 1972)
 The Good Times are Killing Me (Swallow Records, 1972)
 The Balfa Brothers Play Traditional Cajun Music Vol. 2 (1974)
 J'ai Vu le Loup, Le Renard et la Belette (1976, re-released Rounder Records, 1988)
 The Balfa Brothers and Nathan Abshire: The 1970 NYC Cajun Concert (Field Recorders Collective, 2008)
 The Balfa Family: A Retrospective - Festivals Acadiens et Créoles 1977-2010 (Valcour Records, 2012)

See also
 List of people related to Cajun music
 History of Cajun music

References

External links
[ The Balfa Brothers] at Allmusic

 Portrait of Ray Abshire on culturbase.net

American folk musical groups
Musical groups from Louisiana
Cajun fiddlers
Sonet Records artists